The 2007 NRL Grand Final was the conclusive, premiership-deciding match of the 2007 NRL season. It was played between the first-placed Melbourne Storm and second-placed Manly Warringah Sea Eagles at Telstra Stadium on 30 September, in front of 81,392 spectators. The 2007 Grand final was the fourth to be played between the first and second placed teams, and the first in three years. The match was the last Grand Final played at night until 2013; each Grand Final in the intervention switched to a 5:00pm AEST kick-off. This match was also the most-watched television program on Australian TV for 2007.

On 22 April 2010, Melbourne were stripped of this premiership, among other team honours, due to salary cap breaches exposed during the 2006–10 seasons.

Background

The 2007 NRL season was the one hundredth season of professional rugby league football club competition in Australia, and the tenth run by the National Rugby League. Sixteen teams contested the NRL's 2007 Telstra Premiership, and with the inclusion of a new team, the Gold Coast Titans, the competition was the largest run since the 1999 NRL season.

Manly Warringah Sea Eagles

The 2007 Manly Warringah Sea Eagles season was the 58th in the club's history. Coached by Des Hasler and captained by Matt Orford, they finished the regular season in 2nd (out of 16) place.

Melbourne Storm

The 2007 Melbourne Storm season was the 10th in the club's history. Coached by Craig Bellamy and captained by Cameron Smith, they finished the regular season in 1st place to claim the minor premiership before going on to reach their third ever and second consecutive grand final.

Match details
Matt Geyer was the only remaining Melbourne player from the club's 1999 NRL grand final-winning team. The pre-match entertainment included performances from Hoodoo Gurus and Shannon Noll. Player, coach and commentator Frank Hyde was honoured during the half-time break with a video-tribute as well as a minute's silence prior to the Premier League Grand Final. 

First half
Melbourne crossed early in the first half with a try to winger Anthony Quinn via a slick back-line movement that involved 3 decoy runners to lead 6–0. Another set play midway through the first half saw Melbourne extend the scoreline to 10–0 with a barging try to five-eighth Greg Inglis. Seconds before halftime, Manly centre Steve Matai crossed in the corner to take the deficit back to six points. The half-time score read 10–4 to Melbourne, with many surprised at how the scoreline was so close considering Melbourne's dominance.

Second half
The second half started with major controversy after Manly fullback Brett Stewart was knocked unconscious by a massive hit from Melbourne players Michael Crocker and Billy Slater attempting to catch a bomb. Stewart failed to return following the hit, and it proved to be the turning point in the match as Melbourne immediately extended their lead to 14–4 with a try to Crocker. Two quick tries soon after by Melbourne players Matt King and Greg Inglis took the score out to 22–4 and the game looked set for a Melbourne victory. King barged over with a trademark Melbourne decoy play, while Inglis scored the try of the match with a vintage long range 60m run and powerful fend to post his second.

Manly soon pegged the score back to 22–8 with a nice try to winger Chris Hicks but it seemed too little too late for the Manly side. Melbourne then scored two late tries to second-rower Clint Newton and another for Anthony Quinn to take the scoreline to 34–8. Melbourne captain Cameron Smith was inaccurate with the boot, kicking only three goals from eight attempts (including a missed penalty goal).

Inglis was awarded the Clive Churchill Medal for best on field. The 34–8 Grand Final score was the third highest grand final margin in Australian rugby league history.

Half time: Storm 10-4

Clive Churchill Medallist: Greg Inglis

Referee: Tony Archer

Venue: Telstra Stadium, Sydney

Attendance: 81,392

World Club Challenge

Having won the NRL grand final, Melbourne had earned the right to then travel to England for the following February's World Club Challenge match against the winners of the 2007 Super League Grand Final, Leeds Rhinos.

References

NRL Grand Finals
Melbourne Storm matches
Manly Warringah Sea Eagles matches
Grand final